Idwal Jones may refer to:

Idwal Jones (novelist) (1887–1964), novelist and non-fiction writer 
Idwal Jones (writer) (1895–1937), Welsh schoolmaster, poet and dramatist
Idwal Jones (politician) (1900–1982), Welsh politician